Internet Crimes Against Children (ICAC Task Force) is a task force started by the United States Department of Justice's Office of Juvenile Justice and Delinquency Prevention (OJJDP) in 1998. The ICAC program is a national network of 61 coordinated task forces representing more than 5,400 federal, state, and local law enforcement and prosecutorial agencies to prevent Internet crimes against children.  The aims of ICAC task forces are to catch distributors of child pornography on the Internet, whether delivered on-line or solicited on-line and distributed through other channels and to catch sexual predators who solicit victims on the Internet through chat rooms, forums and other methods.

On November 2, 2017, the Providing Resources, Officers, and Technology to Eradicate Cyber Threats to the Protect Our Children Act of 2017 was signed into law, reauthorizing the ICAC Task Force Program through 2022.

On November 15, 2022, the PROTECT Our Children Act of 2022 was passed by the United States Senate, reauthorizing ICAC and the National Strategy for Child Exploitation Prevention and Interdiction through 2024. On December 6, Congress motioned to agree without objection.

See also
Child Exploitation and Obscenity Section
Internet Watch Foundation
National Child Victim Identification Program

References

External links

 

Crime prevention
Computer security organizations
United States Department of Justice agencies
Anti–child pornography organizations
Child welfare in the United States
Task forces